The 2002–03 Colorado State Rams men's basketball team represented Colorado State University during the 2002–03 NCAA Division I men's basketball season. The team was coached by Dale Layer in his 1st season. They played their home games at the Moby Arena on Colorado State University's main campus in Fort Collins, Colorado and were a member of the Mountain West Conference. They finished with a record of 19–14 overall, 5–9 in Mountain West for a sixth-place finish. They went on to win the Mountain West tournament by defeating Wyoming, BYU, and UNLV. They received an automatic bid in the 2003 NCAA tournament as No. 14 seed in the West region. The Rams played tough, but were defeated by No. 3 seed Duke in the opening round.

Roster

Schedule and results 

|-
!colspan=9 style=| Non-conference regular season

|-
!colspan=9 style=| Mountain West regular season

|-
!colspan=9 style=| MWC tournament

|-
!colspan=9 style=| NCAA tournament

References 

Colorado State
Colorado State Rams men's basketball seasons
Colorado State
Colorado State Rams
Colorado State Rams